The 2019 Formula One Esports Series was the third season of the Formula One Esports Series. It started on September 11, 2019 and ended on December 4, 2019. It was held on Formula One's official 2019 game. The championship was held at Gfinity Arena in London, United Kingdom. David Tonizza became the new Formula One Esports Series champion, as Red Bull Racing Esports won the Constructor's Championship title for the first time.

Format 

Following the 2018 Formula One Esports Series success, there is no significant changes to the tournament's format.
 Qualification - The season opens with online qualification, a global call for participation. Qualification is open to anyone with a copy of the official Formula 1 video game developed by Codemasters. The fastest gamers get through.
 Pro Draft - Qualifying gamers enter the Pro Draft where the official Formula 1 teams select their drivers to represent them in the F1 Esports Pro Series championships.
 Pro Series - The drivers race in 25-50% races over a series of events that are broadcast live. They earn points for themselves and their F1 teams. These races will determine the  F1 New Balance Esports Series Teams’ and Drivers’ World Champions, with a portion of the prize fund distributed to the teams based on their standings.

Teams and drivers 
The grid was increased from 9 to 10 teams this season, with Ferrari Driver Academy entering F1 Esports for the first time.

Calendar

Results

Season summary

Championship Standings

Scoring system 

Points were awarded to the top 10 classified finishers in the race and one point was given to the driver who set the fastest lap inside the top ten. No extra points are awarded to the pole-sitter.

In the event of a tie at the conclusion of the championship, a count-back system is used as a tie-breaker, with a driver's/constructor's best result used to decide the standings.

Drivers' Championship standings

Teams' Championship standings 

Notes:
The standings are sorted by best result, rows are not related to the drivers. In case of tie on points, the best positions achieved determined the outcome.

References

External links 
 

Formula One Esports Series
Esports
2019 in esports